Gelora Supriyadi Stadium is a football stadium in the city of Blitar, Indonesia. The stadium has a capacity of 15,000 people.

It is the home base of PSBK Blitar and Blitar United.

References

Sports venues in Indonesia
Football venues in Indonesia